is a passenger railway station in located in the town of Hino,  Shiga Prefecture, Japan, operated by the private railway operator Ohmi Railway.

Lines
Hino Station is served by the Ohmi Railway Main Line, and is located 37.8 rail kilometers from the terminus of the line at Maibara Station.

Station layout
The station consists of two unnumbered opposed side platforms connected by a level crossing.

Platforms

Adjacent stations

History
Hino Station was opened on October 1, 1900. In 2017, plans to demolish the old station building were opposed by local residents in favor of preservation, and after remodeling the old station building is now used as a cafe, tourist information center and museum.

Passenger statistics
In fiscal 2018, the station was used by an average of 472 passengers daily (boarding passengers only).

Surroundings
 Shiga Prefectural Road 183 Hino Tokuhara Line
Hino Municipal Hissa Elementary School
Hino Town Hall

See also
List of railway stations in Japan

References

External links

 Ohmi Railway official site 

Railway stations in Japan opened in 1900
Railway stations in Shiga Prefecture
Hino, Shiga